"Okuribito" (Japanese: おくりびと , "one who sends off") is a song recorded by Japanese-American singer-songwriter Ai, released September 10, 2008, by Island Records and Universal Sigma. It served as the image song for the film of the same name, titled Departures in English.

Background and release 
After watching the Departures preview and hearing the instrumental of the image song, Ai worked with Joe Hisaishi to add lyrics to the instrumental piece. In July 2008, the song was announced. In August, the release date of the single was announced. "Okuribito" would be released physically alongside "So Special" as a double A-side single.

Live performances 
Ai performed the song live for the first time on September 6, 2008, at the Music Fair 21, days before the song was officially released.

Charts

References 

2000s ballads
2008 singles
2008 songs
Songs written by Ai (singer)
Ai (singer) songs
Island Records singles
Songs written for films

Universal Sigma singles